Stourport Hockey Club is a field hockey club that is based at the Stourport Sports Club in Stourport-on-Severn in Worcestershire.

Achievements
 1987–88 Men's League Runner-up
 1989–90 Men's Cup Runner-up

Teams
The club runs five women's teams  with the first XI playing in the Women's England Hockey League Division One North. The men's section has six men's teams  with the first XI playing in Premier division of the Midland Men's Hockey League.

International players
International player Imran Sherwani formerly played for Stourport.

References

English field hockey clubs
Sport in Worcestershire